Pseudodaphnella nexa is a species of sea snail, a marine gastropod mollusk in the family Raphitomidae.

Description
The length of the shell varies between 10 mm and 20 mm.

The whorls are rounded, plicately ribbed, encircled with fine narrow cords, becoming nodulous on crossing the ribs. The outer lip is flattened. The sinus is broad-whitish, stained with chestnut. The cords are darker chestnut or chocolate.

Distribution
This marine species occurs in the Indo-West Pacific and off India, the Philippines, Christmas Island and in the China Seas and off Queensland, Australia.

References

 Reeve, L.A. 1845. Monograph of the genus Pleurotoma. pls 20–33 in Reeve, L.A. (ed). Conchologia Iconica. London : L. Reeve & Co. Vol. 1. 
 Powell, A.W.B. 1966. The molluscan families Speightiidae and Turridae, an evaluation of the valid taxa, both Recent and fossil, with list of characteristic species. Bulletin of the Auckland Institute and Museum. Auckland, New Zealand 5: 1–184, pls 1–23
 Liu, J.Y. [Ruiyu] (ed.). (2008). Checklist of marine biota of China seas. China Science Press. 1267 pp

External links
 
 MNHN. Paris: specimen
 N. V. Subba Rao  "Indian Seashells—Polyplacophora and Gastropoda (1)"; Records of the Zoological Survey of India; Occasional Paper No. 192

nexa
Gastropods described in 1845